Fox Barrel is a brand of perry (marketed as "pear cider") made in Colfax, California, United States.

History 

The Fox Barrel company was co-founded in 2004 by Bruce Nissen and Sean Deorsey. It was purchased by Minneapolis, MN based Crispin Cider Company in early 2010.  

Fox Barrel perry and Crispin cider are both now made in a cidery in Colfax, CA located at 1213 South Auburn Street, directly off of Interstate 80, between Sacramento and Tahoe.

Crispin and Fox Barrel were purchased by MillerCoors in 2012. Fox Barrel products were folded into the Crispin Label in 2014.

Varieties

Black Label 
Sold in four packs of 12 ounce bottles.
 Pacific Pear (green label): Perry made from 100% pear juice (not from concentrate)
 Blackberry Pear (purple label) 
 Apricot Pear (yellow label)
 Black Currant (discontinued, purple label)

Imports 
 English Perry: Perry produced in England (16.9 ounce cans)

Reserves 
 Rhubarb and Elderberry: Perry brewed with the juices of rhubarb and elderberries as well as honey.
 Wit Pear: Perry with orange peel and coriander as well as honey.

Boxed 
This line is packaged in bag-in-boxes.
 Pomegranate & Pear

Limited Releases 
 Maid Of Orleans: Perry aged in Sauvignon blanc wine barrels with added jasmine
 Mulled Cider: Pear "cider" with a blend of spices. It is recommended to serve warm. (orange label, 22 ounce bottles)
 Pear Naked: Totally organic perry (green label, 22 ounce bottles)
 Wild Orchard: Perry brewed with Champagne wine yeast
 Wonderwall: Released as a tribute to (What's The Story) Morning Glory?

Awards 
2005
 Gold Medal Winner at California Brewers Competition (Pear)

2006
 Silver Medal Winner at G.L.O.W.S (Black Currant)
 Gold Medal Winner at G.L.O.W.S. (Pear)
 Gold Medal Winner at California State Fair (Pear)

2007
 Gold Medal Winner at San Diego County Fair (Pear)
 First Place Winner at West Coast Brewers Craft Convention (Pear)
 Gold Medal California State Fair (Pear)
 Bronze Medal Winner at G.L.O.W.S (Pear)
 Silver Medal Winner at G.L.O.W.S (Black Currant)

2008
 Silver Medal California State Fair (Pear)
 Gold Medal California State Fair (Black Currant)

"2011"
 Gold Medal at Great Lakes International Cider & Perry Competition (Apricot Pear)
 Gold Medal at Great Lakes International Cider & Perry Competition (Blackberry Pear)
 Silver Medal at Great Lakes International Cider & Perry Competition (Pear Naked)
 Silver Medal at Great Lakes International Cider & Perry Competition (Mulled Cider)

References

External links 
 FoxBarrel.com

American ciders
Food and drink companies based in California
Companies based in Colfax, California